W. J. "Blondie" Williams was an American football player and coach. He was the starting quarterback for Mississippi A&M  in 1911. Williams served as the head football coach at Mississippi Normal College —now known as the University of Southern Mississippi—in 1913, compiling a record of 1–5–1.

Head coaching record

References

Year of birth missing
Year of death missing
American football quarterbacks
Mississippi State Bulldogs football players
Southern Miss Golden Eagles football coaches